is a Latin term used by Cicero in , ("The Nature of the Gods") and has been translated as "inspiration".

Cicero's usage was a literalising of "inspiration", which had already become figurative. As "inspiration" had come to mean simply the gathering of a new idea, Cicero reiterated the idea of a rush of unexpected breath, a powerful force that would render the poet helpless and unaware of its origin.

Literally, the Latin  means "to blow upon/toward". It can be taken to mean "to be blown upon" by a divine wind, like its English equivalent inspiration, which comes from inspire, meaning "to breathe/blow onto".

In English,  is used for the literal form of inspiration. It generally refers not to the usual sudden originality but the staggering and stunning blow of a new idea, which the recipient may be unable to explain. The frequent use of the Aeolian harp as a symbol for the poet was a play on the renewed emphasis on afflatus.

 ('Inspired by the Holy Spirit') is an encyclical letter of Pope Pius XII dealing with Biblical inspiration and Biblical criticism. It lay out his desire to see new translations from the original language instead of the Vulgate.

See also
 Divine inspiration
 List of Latin phrases (N):  (No great man ever existed who did not enjoy some portion of divine inspiration).

References

 

Latin words and phrases
Literary criticism
Poetics